Veronica "Roni" Kedar (born ) is an Israeli director, producer, screenwriter and actress.

Biography 
Veronica Kedar studied film at the Beit Berl College of Arts in Israel. Her graduation film, Tail, won the Promising Director Award at the International Student Film Festival in Tel Aviv and a special screenwriting grant at the Up & Coming Film Festival in Germany 2010.

Kedar's debut feature, Joe & Belle, played at numerous film festivals and was nominated for Best Picture at the Israeli Academy Awards 2012. Kedar received an Excellence Award from the Israeli Ministry of Culture for her contribution to independent cinema in Israel.

In 2013, Kedar shot her experimental feature film, Endtime on one night. The film premiered at the Sitges Film Festival.

Kedar's recent feature film Family, premiered at the Jerusalem Film Festival in July 2017. The film was nominated for three Israeli Academy Awards.

Films

Awards and nominations

External links 
 
 

1984 births
Living people
People from Tel Aviv
Israeli film actresses
Israeli film directors
Israeli Jews